Elomaa is a Finnish surname. Notable people with the surname include:

 Heikki Elomaa (born 1986), Finnish sailor
 Kike Elomaa (born 1955), Finnish female bodybuilder, politician, and singer
 Pekka Elomaa (1948–1995), Finnish actor

Finnish-language surnames